is a Prefectural Natural Park in northwest Kagoshima Prefecture, Japan. Established in 1953, the park is within the municipality of Akune.

See also
 National Parks of Japan

References

Parks and gardens in Kagoshima Prefecture
Protected areas established in 1953
1953 establishments in Japan